The 2021 Formula Regional European Championship by Alpine was a multi-event, Formula 3 open-wheel single seater motor racing championship held across Europe. The championship featured a mix of professional and amateur drivers, competing in Formula 3 cars that conform to the FIA Formula 3 regulations for the championship. This was the third season of the championship and the first after a merger with Formula Renault Eurocup which resulted to the change of the engine supplier to Alpine.

The season commenced on 17 April at Imola Circuit and concluded on 31 October at Autodromo Nazionale di Monza, after ten rounds.

Swiss driver Grégoire Saucy, driving for ART Grand Prix, took the drivers' title in Round 9 at Mugello.

Teams and drivers
Thirteen teams had been pre-selected to the 2021 championship. Teams had a maximum of three cars, but were allowed to run a fourth car if they enter with a female driver. G4 Racing took over Bhaitech's entry and M2 Competition withdrew as only twelve teams are allowed to compete in the series.

 Casper Stevenson was scheduled to compete for Van Amersfoort Racing, but withdrew prior to the start of the season. His seat was taken by Mari Boya, who was originally set to race for FA Racing by MP. Gabriel Bortoleto, who had initially signed for DR Formula, replaced Boya at FA Racing by MP.

Race calendar

The initial calendar was revealed on 7 December 2020. The series adopted the Formula Renault Eurocup weekend format with qualifying session 1 and race 1 on Saturday and qualifying session 2 and race 2 on Sunday. After rescheduling the season opener at Spa to support the Emilia Romagna Grand Prix, the second Imola round was subsequently dropped and plans to reinclude Spa were announced. A planned round at the Nürburgring was cancelled because of the flood disaster in the region, with a replacement at Circuit Ricardo Tormo added later.

Results

Championship standings 

 Points system

Points were awarded to the top 10 classified finishers.

Drivers' standings

Teams' standings 
For teams entering more than two cars only the two best-finishing cars were eligible to score points in the teams' championship.

Notes

References

External links

 ACI Sport page

Formula Regional European Championship seasons
Regional European Championship
Formula Regional European Championship